This is a list of amphibians and reptiles found on Dominica, a Caribbean island-nation in the Lesser Antilles.  Dominica is one of the few islands in that chain that has retained its original amphibian and reptile fauna over the last 200 years, and reptiles in particular form a significant part of its fauna.

Amphibians
There are four species of amphibians on Dominica, all from the frog family Leptodactylidae.  Three are native, and one, Eleutherodactylus amplinympha, is endemic to Dominica.

Frogs (Anura)

Reptiles
Two of the four extant orders of reptile are represented on Dominica: Squamata and Testudines.  Including marine turtles and introduced species, there are a total of 19 confirmed species of reptiles.

Endemic reptile species include the Dominican anole (Anolis oculatus), the Dominican ground lizard (Ameiva fuscata) and the Dominica skink (Mabuya dominicana).  The Dominican blind snake (Typhlops dominicanus or T. d. dominicanus) and the Dominican clouded boa (Boa constrictor nebulosis) may also be designated as endemic, though their status as distinct subspecies is unresolved.

Turtles (Testudines)

Lizards and snakes (Squamata)

Unconfirmed or disputed reptile species

Notes

References
Note: Species listed above are presumed to be supported by all references unless otherwise cited.

 Amphibians
.
Amphibians
Dominica
 Dominica
Dominica
Dominica
Dominica